Yari Otto (born 27 May 1999) is a German professional footballer who plays as a forward for 3. Liga club SC Verl.

Personal life
Yari's brother Nick also a footballer.

References

External links
 
 

1999 births
People from Wolfsburg
Footballers from Lower Saxony
Living people
German footballers
Germany youth international footballers
Association football forwards
Eintracht Braunschweig players
SC Verl players
Oberliga (football) players
3. Liga players
2. Bundesliga players